The 1932 Pittsburgh Pirates season was the 51st season of the Pittsburgh Pirates franchise; the 46th in the National League. The Pirates finished second in the league standings with a record of 86–68.

Regular season 
The Pirates' starting lineup included four future Hall of Famers: Pie Traynor, Arky Vaughan, Lloyd Waner, and Paul Waner. At just 20 years old, Vaughan was the youngest player in the majors in 1932.

Season standings

Record vs. opponents

Game log

|- bgcolor="ffbbbb"
| 1 || April 12 || @ Cardinals || 2–10 || Rhem || French (0–1) || — || 5,924 || 0–1
|- bgcolor="ffbbbb"
| 2 || April 13 || @ Cardinals || 8–9 || Lindsey || Spencer (0–1) || — || — || 0–2
|- bgcolor="ccffcc"
| 3 || April 14 || @ Cardinals || 5–4 || French (1–1) || Derringer || — || — || 1–2
|- bgcolor="ccffcc"
| 4 || April 15 || @ Cardinals || 9–7 || Brame (1–0) || Johnson || — || 1,988 || 2–2
|- bgcolor="ffbbbb"
| 5 || April 16 || @ Reds || 0–5 || Johnson || Harris (0–1) || — || — || 2–3
|- bgcolor="ccffcc"
| 6 || April 17 || @ Reds || 4–3 || Spencer (1–1) || Benton || Swift (1) || — || 3–3
|- bgcolor="ffbbbb"
| 7 || April 18 || @ Reds || 0–5 || Kolp || French (1–2) || — || — || 3–4
|- bgcolor="ccffcc"
| 8 || April 20 || Cardinals || 7–0 || Swetonic (1–0) || Hallahan || — || — || 4–4
|- bgcolor="ccffcc"
| 9 || April 21 || Cardinals || 7–6 (10) || French (2–2) || Frey || — || — || 5–4
|- bgcolor="ffbbbb"
| 10 || April 22 || Cardinals || 3–5 (10) || Johnson || French (2–3) || — || — || 5–5
|- bgcolor="ccffcc"
| 11 || April 23 || Cardinals || 10–9 || Swift (1–0) || Dean || — || — || 6–5
|- bgcolor="ffbbbb"
| 12 || April 24 || @ Cubs || 3–12 || Root || Spencer (1–2) || — || 8,000 || 6–6
|- bgcolor="ffbbbb"
| 13 || April 27 || @ Cubs || 4–8 || Malone || Swetonic (1–1) || — || — || 6–7
|- bgcolor="ffbbbb"
| 14 || April 28 || Reds || 6–7 || Ogden || French (2–4) || — || — || 6–8
|- bgcolor="ffbbbb"
| 15 || April 29 || Reds || 4–6 || Rixey || Brame (1–1) || — || — || 6–9
|-

|- bgcolor="ffbbbb"
| 16 || May 1 || @ Reds || 5–7 || Lucas || French (2–5) || — || 21,000 || 6–10
|- bgcolor="ccffcc"
| 17 || May 2 || Cubs || 2–0 || Swetonic (2–1) || Malone || — || — || 7–10
|- bgcolor="ffbbbb"
| 18 || May 3 || Cubs || 6–8 || Smith || Swift (1–1) || — || — || 7–11
|- bgcolor="ffbbbb"
| 19 || May 4 || Cubs || 1–4 || Warneke || French (2–6) || — || — || 7–12
|- bgcolor="ffbbbb"
| 20 || May 6 || Phillies || 2–4 || Elliott || Harris (0–2) || — || — || 7–13
|- bgcolor="ffbbbb"
| 21 || May 7 || Phillies || 3–5 || Hansen || Spencer (1–3) || Benge || — || 7–14
|- bgcolor="ffbbbb"
| 22 || May 9 || Braves || 5–6 (12) || Frankhouse || French (2–7) || Cantwell || — || 7–15
|- bgcolor="ccffcc"
| 23 || May 15 || @ Dodgers || 2–0 || Swetonic (3–1) || Shaute || — || 25,000 || 8–15
|- bgcolor="ffbbbb"
| 24 || May 16 || Dodgers || 1–11 || Mungo || French (2–8) || — || — || 8–16
|- bgcolor="ccffcc"
| 25 || May 17 || Dodgers || 3–1 || Harris (1–2) || Phelps || — || — || 9–16
|- bgcolor="ffbbbb"
| 26 || May 18 || Dodgers || 2–4 || Clark || Swift (1–2) || — || — || 9–17
|- bgcolor="ccffcc"
| 27 || May 19 || Dodgers || 3–2 || Chagnon (1–0) || Shaute || — || — || 10–17
|- bgcolor="ccffcc"
| 28 || May 20 || @ Cardinals || 5–0 || French (3–8) || Derringer || — || — || 11–17
|- bgcolor="ccffcc"
| 29 || May 22 || @ Cardinals || 5–1 || Swetonic (4–1) || Dean || — || — || 12–17
|- bgcolor="ffbbbb"
| 30 || May 22 || @ Cardinals || 3–5 || Hallahan || Harris (1–3) || — || — || 12–18
|- bgcolor="ccffcc"
| 31 || May 24 || @ Reds || 5–3 (12) || Spencer (2–3) || Frey || — || — || 13–18
|- bgcolor="ccffcc"
| 32 || May 25 || @ Reds || 9–4 || Kremer (1–0) || Carroll || Swift (2) || — || 14–18
|- bgcolor="ccffcc"
| 33 || May 26 || @ Reds || 3–2 || Harris (2–3) || Lucas || Swift (3) || 11,633 || 15–18
|- bgcolor="ccffcc"
| 34 || May 27 || Cardinals || 8–4 || French (4–8) || Haines || — || — || 16–18
|- bgcolor="ccffcc"
| 35 || May 28 || Cardinals || 8–6 || Swetonic (5–1) || Dean || — || — || 17–18
|- bgcolor="ffbbbb"
| 36 || May 29 || @ Cubs || 3–7 || Malone || Chagnon (1–1) || — || — || 17–19
|- bgcolor="ccffcc"
| 37 || May 29 || @ Cubs || 2–0 || Spencer (3–3) || Smith || — || 36,000 || 18–19
|- bgcolor="ffbbbb"
| 38 || May 30 || Reds || 2–4 || Rixey || Harris (2–4) || — || — || 18–20
|- bgcolor="ccffcc"
| 39 || May 30 || Reds || 5–2 || Swift (2–2) || Benton || — || — || 19–20
|- bgcolor="ccffcc"
| 40 || May 31 || Reds || 4–1 || French (5–8) || Lucas || — || — || 20–20
|-

|- bgcolor="ffbbbb"
| 41 || June 2 || Cubs || 5–9 || Root || Spencer (3–4) || — || — || 20–21
|- bgcolor="ccffcc"
| 42 || June 3 || Cubs || 6–5 (11) || Swetonic (6–1) || May || — || — || 21–21
|- bgcolor="ccffcc"
| 43 || June 4 || Cubs || 12–4 || Meine (1–0) || Grimes || — || — || 22–21
|- bgcolor="ccffcc"
| 44 || June 7 || @ Phillies || 7–4 || French (6–8) || Hansen || — || — || 23–21
|- bgcolor="ffbbbb"
| 45 || June 8 || @ Phillies || 10–11 || Berly || Spencer (3–5) || Benge || — || 23–22
|- bgcolor="ccffcc"
| 46 || June 9 || @ Phillies || 4–3 || Swetonic (7–1) || Holley || French (1) || — || 24–22
|- bgcolor="ffbbbb"
| 47 || June 10 || @ Phillies || 5–6 || Benge || Meine (1–1) || — || — || 24–23
|- bgcolor="ffbbbb"
| 48 || June 11 || @ Giants || 4–6 || Walker || French (6–9) || — || — || 24–24
|- bgcolor="ccffcc"
| 49 || June 15 || @ Braves || 5–2 || Swift (3–2) || Brandt || — || — || 25–24
|- bgcolor="ccffcc"
| 50 || June 18 || @ Braves || 2–0 (11) || Swetonic (8–1) || Brown || — || — || 26–24
|- bgcolor="ffbbbb"
| 51 || June 18 || @ Braves || 1–2 || Betts || Kremer (1–1) || — || — || 26–25
|- bgcolor="ccffcc"
| 52 || June 19 || @ Dodgers || 2–1 || Meine (2–1) || Clark || Swift (4) || 18,000 || 27–25
|- bgcolor="ffbbbb"
| 53 || June 20 || @ Dodgers || 1–2 || Mungo || Harris (2–5) || — || — || 27–26
|- bgcolor="ffbbbb"
| 54 || June 21 || @ Dodgers || 2–9 || Heimach || Swift (3–3) || — || — || 27–27
|- bgcolor="ccffcc"
| 55 || June 22 || @ Dodgers || 7–6 || French (7–9) || Shaute || Spencer (1) || — || 28–27
|- bgcolor="ccffcc"
| 56 || June 24 || Reds || 4–3 || Meine (3–1) || Rixey || — || — || 29–27
|- bgcolor="ccffcc"
| 57 || June 25 || Reds || 5–4 (11) || Swift (4–3) || Lucas || — || — || 30–27
|- bgcolor="ccffcc"
| 58 || June 25 || Reds || 8–5 || Kremer (2–1) || Kolp || Meine (1) || — || 31–27
|- bgcolor="ccffcc"
| 59 || June 26 || @ Reds || 5–0 || French (8–9) || Johnson || — || — || 32–27
|- bgcolor="ccffcc"
| 60 || June 26 || @ Reds || 9–5 || Swift (5–3) || Carroll || — || — || 33–27
|- bgcolor="ccffcc"
| 61 || June 30 || Cardinals || 9–6 || Swift (6–3) || Stout || — || — || 34–27
|-

|- bgcolor="ffbbbb"
| 62 || July 1 || Cardinals || 3–5 || Dean || Swetonic (8–2) || Lindsey || — || 34–28
|- bgcolor="ffbbbb"
| 63 || July 2 || Cardinals || 4–5 || Hallahan || Kremer (2–2) || — || — || 34–29
|- bgcolor="ccffcc"
| 64 || July 3 || @ Cubs || 5–4 (6) || Meine (4–1) || Malone || — || 18,000 || 35–29
|- bgcolor="ccffcc"
| 65 || July 4 || Cubs || 9–6 || Harris (3–5) || Grimes || — || — || 36–29
|- bgcolor="ccffcc"
| 66 || July 4 || Cubs || 6–5 (11) || Chagnon (2–1) || Bush || — || — || 37–29
|- bgcolor="ccffcc"
| 67 || July 5 || Giants || 4–3 (10) || Swift (7–3) || Walker || — || — || 38–29
|- bgcolor="ccffcc"
| 68 || July 6 || Giants || 4–2 || Swetonic (9–2) || Mooney || — || — || 39–29
|- bgcolor="ccffcc"
| 69 || July 6 || Giants || 3–1 || French (9–9) || Luque || — || — || 40–29
|- bgcolor="ffbbbb"
| 70 || July 7 || Giants || 3–4 || Hoyt || Meine (4–2) || — || — || 40–30
|- bgcolor="ccffcc"
| 71 || July 8 || Giants || 8–7 || Chagnon (3–1) || Mooney || — || — || 41–30
|- bgcolor="ffbbbb"
| 72 || July 9 || Dodgers || 3–9 || Vance || Harris (3–6) || — || — || 41–31
|- bgcolor="ccffcc"
| 73 || July 10 || @ Dodgers || 8–7 || Swift (8–3) || Quinn || — || 15,000 || 42–31
|- bgcolor="ccffcc"
| 74 || July 11 || Dodgers || 5–3 || Swetonic (10–2) || Heimach || — || — || 43–31
|- bgcolor="ccffcc"
| 75 || July 12 || Dodgers || 8–7 (12) || Harris (4–6) || Moore || — || — || 44–31
|- bgcolor="ffbbbb"
| 76 || July 13 || Braves || 1–5 || Brandt || French (9–10) || — || — || 44–32
|- bgcolor="ffbbbb"
| 77 || July 13 || Braves || 5–10 || Zachary || Chagnon (3–2) || — || — || 44–33
|- bgcolor="ccffcc"
| 78 || July 14 || Braves || 6–1 || Swift (9–3) || Seibold || — || — || 45–33
|- bgcolor="ccffcc"
| 79 || July 15 || Braves || 1–0 || Kremer (3–2) || Pruett || — || — || 46–33
|- bgcolor="ccffcc"
| 80 || July 16 || Braves || 2–1 || Meine (5–2) || Betts || — || — || 47–33
|- bgcolor="ccffcc"
| 81 || July 16 || Braves || 9–8 (10) || Chagnon (4–2) || Brandt || — || — || 48–33
|- bgcolor="ffbbbb"
| 82 || July 18 || Phillies || 4–5 (11) || Collins || French (9–11) || — || — || 48–34
|- bgcolor="ccffcc"
| 83 || July 19 || Phillies || 5–2 || Swift (10–3) || Hansen || — || — || 49–34
|- bgcolor="ffbbbb"
| 84 || July 19 || Phillies || 5–6 (11) || Collins || Harris (4–7) || — || — || 49–35
|- bgcolor="ffbbbb"
| 85 || July 20 || Phillies || 2–6 || Holley || Meine (5–3) || — || — || 49–36
|- bgcolor="ccffcc"
| 86 || July 21 || Phillies || 3–2 || Kremer (4–2) || Elliott || — || — || 50–36
|- bgcolor="ccffcc"
| 87 || July 22 || Cubs || 3–1 || Swetonic (11–2) || Malone || — || — || 51–36
|- bgcolor="ccffcc"
| 88 || July 23 || Cubs || 11–8 || Brame (2–1) || Smith || Harris (1) || — || 52–36
|- bgcolor="ffbbbb"
| 89 || July 24 || @ Cubs || 2–7 || Warneke || Meine (5–4) || — || — || 52–37
|- bgcolor="ccffcc"
| 90 || July 24 || @ Cubs || 7–5 || Harris (5–7) || Bush || — || 48,000 || 53–37
|- bgcolor="ffbbbb"
| 91 || July 26 || @ Giants || 3–7 || Hubbell || French (9–12) || — || 20,000 || 53–38
|- bgcolor="ccffcc"
| 92 || July 26 || @ Giants || 7–5 (10) || Chagnon (5–2) || Schumacher || — || 20,000 || 54–38
|- bgcolor="ccffcc"
| 93 || July 27 || @ Giants || 9–8 || Harris (6–7) || Gibson || French (2) || — || 55–38
|- bgcolor="ccffcc"
| 94 || July 27 || @ Giants || 4–2 || Harris (7–7) || Hoyt || — || — || 56–38
|- bgcolor="ccffcc"
| 95 || July 28 || @ Giants || 10–7 || Brame (3–1) || Fitzsimmons || French (3) || 10,000 || 57–38
|- bgcolor="ccffcc"
| 96 || July 28 || @ Giants || 9–1 || Meine (6–4) || Bell || — || — || 58–38
|-

|- bgcolor="ffbbbb"
| 100 || August 1 || @ Phillies || 5–18 || Rhem || Meine (6–5) || — || — || 59–41
|- bgcolor="ffbbbb"
| 101 || August 2 || @ Phillies || 6–11 || Elliott || French (9–13) || Hansen || — || 59–42
|- bgcolor="ffbbbb"
| 102 || August 4 || @ Dodgers || 4–7 || Clark || Swetonic (11–3) || — || — || 59–43
|- bgcolor="ffbbbb"
| 103 || August 4 || @ Dodgers || 5–6 (10) || Thurston || Swift (10–5) || — || 25,000 || 59–44
|- bgcolor="ffbbbb"
| 104 || August 6 || @ Dodgers || 1–2 || Heimach || Meine (6–6) || — || 10,000 || 59–45
|- bgcolor="ffbbbb"
| 105 || August 7 || @ Braves || 1–2 || Brandt || Swetonic (11–4) || — || — || 59–46
|- bgcolor="ffbbbb"
| 106 || August 7 || @ Braves || 6–7 || Cantwell || Swift (10–6) || — || 29,000 || 59–47
|- bgcolor="ffbbbb"
| 107 || August 9 || @ Braves || 0–4 || Betts || Kremer (4–3) || — || — || 59–48
|- bgcolor="ccffcc"
| 108 || August 10 || @ Braves || 5–2 || Meine (7–6) || Zachary || — || — || 60–48
|- bgcolor="ffbbbb"
| 109 || August 10 || @ Braves || 2–3 || Brandt || French (9–14) || — || — || 60–49
|- bgcolor="ffbbbb"
| 110 || August 11 || Cubs || 2–3 (10) || Bush || Swetonic (11–5) || — || — || 60–50
|- bgcolor="ffbbbb"
| 111 || August 13 || Reds || 0–3 || Rixey || Swift (10–7) || — || — || 60–51
|- bgcolor="ffbbbb"
| 112 || August 15 || Dodgers || 6–11 || Shaute || Meine (7–7) || — || — || 60–52
|- bgcolor="ccffcc"
| 113 || August 16 || Dodgers || 4–0 || French (10–14) || Clark || — || — || 61–52
|- bgcolor="ffbbbb"
| 114 || August 17 || Dodgers || 1–4 || Heimach || Swift (10–8) || Mungo || — || 61–53
|- bgcolor="ffbbbb"
| 115 || August 19 || Giants || 4–10 || Hubbell || Meine (7–8) || — || 6,000 || 61–54
|- bgcolor="ccffcc"
| 116 || August 20 || Giants || 3–2 || French (11–14) || Walker || — || — || 62–54
|- bgcolor="ffbbbb"
| 117 || August 20 || Giants || 1–8 || Bell || Harris (8–8) || — || — || 62–55
|- bgcolor="ffbbbb"
| 118 || August 21 || @ Reds || 0–2 || Rixey || Swift (10–9) || — || — || 62–56
|- bgcolor="ccffcc"
| 119 || August 22 || Giants || 6–1 || Meine (8–8) || Mooney || — || — || 63–56
|- bgcolor="ffbbbb"
| 120 || August 22 || Giants || 3–4 || Hoyt || Chagnon (5–3) || — || — || 63–57
|- bgcolor="ccffcc"
| 121 || August 23 || Giants || 4–3 || French (12–14) || Hubbell || — || — || 64–57
|- bgcolor="ffbbbb"
| 122 || August 24 || Phillies || 6–9 || Collins || Spencer (3–7) || — || — || 64–58
|- bgcolor="ffbbbb"
| 123 || August 25 || Phillies || 3–11 || Hansen || Meine (8–9) || — || — || 64–59
|- bgcolor="ffbbbb"
| 124 || August 25 || Phillies || 5–6 (10) || Elliott || French (12–15) || — || — || 64–60
|- bgcolor="ccffcc"
| 125 || August 26 || Phillies || 8–0 || Chagnon (6–3) || Collins || — || — || 65–60
|- bgcolor="ccffcc"
| 126 || August 27 || Braves || 7–4 || French (13–15) || Brandt || — || — || 66–60
|- bgcolor="ccffcc"
| 127 || August 30 || Braves || 10–7 || Harris (9–8) || Brandt || French (4) || — || 67–60
|- bgcolor="ccffcc"
| 128 || August 30 || Braves || 3–2 || Swift (11–9) || Frankhouse || — || — || 68–60
|- bgcolor="ccffcc"
| 129 || August 31 || Braves || 2–1 || Chagnon (7–3) || Betts || — || — || 69–60
|-

|- bgcolor="ccffcc"
| 130 || September 2 || Reds || 2–1 || French (14–15) || Lucas || — || — || 70–60
|- bgcolor="ccffcc"
| 131 || September 3 || Reds || 7–1 || Swift (12–9) || Rixey || — || — || 71–60
|- bgcolor="ccffcc"
| 132 || September 4 || @ Reds || 5–2 || Chagnon (8–3) || Benton || Harris (2) || — || 72–60
|- bgcolor="ccffcc"
| 133 || September 5 || Cardinals || 4–3 || Meine (9–9) || Stout || — || — || 73–60
|- bgcolor="ccffcc"
| 134 || September 5 || Cardinals || 3–1 || French (15–15) || Derringer || — || — || 74–60
|- bgcolor="ccffcc"
| 135 || September 7 || @ Dodgers || 8–3 || Swift (13–9) || Mungo || — || 12,500 || 75–60
|- bgcolor="ffbbbb"
| 136 || September 7 || @ Dodgers || 2–4 || Heimach || Harris (9–9) || — || 12,500 || 75–61
|- bgcolor="ffbbbb"
| 137 || September 8 || @ Dodgers || 2–12 || Clark || Chagnon (8–4) || — || 1,000 || 75–62
|- bgcolor="ccffcc"
| 138 || September 10 || @ Phillies || 5–2 || French (16–15) || Hansen || — || — || 76–62
|- bgcolor="ccffcc"
| 139 || September 10 || @ Phillies || 5–4 || Meine (10–9) || Elliott || — || — || 77–62
|- bgcolor="ccffcc"
| 140 || September 12 || @ Phillies || 4–2 || Swift (14–9) || Rhem || — || — || 78–62
|- bgcolor="ffbbbb"
| 141 || September 13 || @ Braves || 0–3 || Brandt || Chagnon (8–5) || — || — || 78–63
|- bgcolor="ffbbbb"
| 142 || September 14 || @ Braves || 2–5 || Brown || French (16–16) || — || — || 78–64
|- bgcolor="ccffcc"
| 143 || September 15 || @ Braves || 3–2 || Meine (11–9) || Betts || — || — || 79–64
|- bgcolor="ffbbbb"
| 144 || September 17 || @ Giants || 4–7 || Walker || Swift (14–10) || Luque || — || 79–65
|- bgcolor="ccffcc"
| 145 || September 18 || @ Giants || 7–4 || French (17–16) || Schumacher || — || 15,000 || 80–65
|- bgcolor="ccffcc"
| 146 || September 18 || @ Giants || 6–3 || Chagnon (9–5) || Parmelee || — || 15,000 || 81–65
|- bgcolor="ffbbbb"
| 147 || September 20 || @ Cubs || 2–5 || Bush || Swetonic (11–6) || — || — || 81–66
|- bgcolor="ccffcc"
| 148 || September 20 || @ Cubs || 5–0 || Meine (12–9) || Tinning || — || — || 82–66
|- bgcolor="ccffcc"
| 149 || September 21 || @ Cubs || 9–6 || Spencer (4–7) || Herrmann || — || — || 83–66
|- bgcolor="ccffcc"
| 150 || September 22 || @ Cubs || 7–0 || Smith (1–0) || Grimes || — || — || 84–66
|- bgcolor="ffbbbb"
| 151 || September 23 || @ Cardinals || 4–8 || Derringer || Chagnon (9–6) || — || — || 84–67
|- bgcolor="ccffcc"
| 152 || September 24 || @ Cardinals || 7–4 || French (18–16) || Winford || — || — || 85–67
|- bgcolor="ccffcc"
| 153 || September 25 || @ Cardinals || 7–1 || Harris (10–9) || Starr || — || — || 86–67
|- bgcolor="ffbbbb"
| 154 || September 25 || @ Cardinals || 4–7 || Dean || Spencer (4–8) || — || — || 86–68
|-

|-
| Legend:       = Win       = LossBold = Pirates team member

Opening Day lineup

Roster

Player stats

Batting

Starters by position 
Note: Pos = Position; G = Games played; AB = At bats; H = Hits; Avg. = Batting average; HR = Home runs; RBI = Runs batted in

Other batters 
Note: G = Games played; AB = At bats; H = Hits; Avg. = Batting average; HR = Home runs; RBI = Runs batted in

Pitching

Starting pitchers 
Note: G = Games pitched; IP = Innings pitched; W = Wins; L = Losses; ERA = Earned run average; SO = Strikeouts

Other pitchers 
Note: G = Games pitched; IP = Innings pitched; W = Wins; L = Losses; ERA = Earned run average; SO = Strikeouts

Relief pitchers 
Note: G = Games pitched; W = Wins; L = Losses; SV = Saves; ERA = Earned run average; SO = Strikeouts

Awards and honors

League top five finishers 
Tony Piet
 #2 in NL in stolen bases (19)

Steve Swetonic
 #4 in NL in ERA (2.82)

Paul Waner
 #4 in NL in batting average (.341)
 #4 in NL in hits (215)

Farm system

LEAGUE CHAMPIONS: Tulsa

References 

 1932 Pittsburgh Pirates team page at Baseball Reference
 1932 Pittsburgh Pirates Page at Baseball Almanac

Pittsburgh Pirates seasons
Pittsburgh Pirates season
Pittsburg Pir